Althenia cylindrocarpa is a species of aquatic plant in the family Potamogetonaceae. It is found in fresh to brackish waters in Australia. This species has been transferred from Lepilaena.

References

External links
Flora of South Australia

Potamogetonaceae
Taxa named by Friedrich August Körnicke
Taxa named by Paul Friedrich August Ascherson